A Sleeping Memory is surviving 1917 silent film drama directed by George D. Baker and starring Emily Stevens. It was produced and distributed by Metro Pictures and is based on the 1902 novel of the same name by E. Phillips Oppenheim.

Cast
Emily Stevens - Eleanore Styles Marston
Frank R. Mills - Powers Fiske (*this Frank Mills, stage actor born 1870 died 1921)
Mario Majeroni - Dr. Stephen Trow
Walter Horton - Henry Johnson
Richard Thornton - Chadwick
Francis Joyner - Angus Hood (*as Frank Joyner)
Kate Blancke - Mrs. Fiske

Preservation status
 A print was preserved and donated by MGM to George Eastman Museum.

References

External links

1917 films
American silent feature films
Films directed by George D. Baker
Metro Pictures films
Films based on British novels
American black-and-white films
Silent American drama films
1917 drama films
1910s American films